Oil Street is a street in Fortress Hill on Hong Kong Island near Fortress Hill station.

Buildings along the street include the Newton Hotel (closed on 25 August 2015), AIA Tower, the former headquarters and clubhouse of the Royal Hong Kong Yacht Club (listed as a Grade II historic buildings), Government Logistics Department's depot and the Harbor Grand Hotel.

Oil Street has a northwest-southeast orientation. It starts east at King's Road, then crosses Electric Road, has intersections with Wang On Road (宏安道) and King Wah Road (京華道), passes under the Island Eastern Corridor and ends shortly thereafter near the shore of Victoria Harbour.

Oil street art village 

The Oil Street ex-Government Supplies Department had been lent to local artists and organisations as short-term tenants, after the relocation of the department in 1998. The building was used as the studio of artists and a venue for artistic event, named the Oil Street Artist Village, which is the Hong Kong's first locally formed art community. After the building was vacated in 2000, some tenants had been moved to the Cattle Depot Artist Village located in To Kwa Wan.

Oi! Art Space 

Oi! is an art space developed by the Leisure and Cultural Services Department in 2013, aiming at promoting arts and providing venue for exhibition. It is located at 12 Oil Street, next to the now demolished Government Supplies Department.
"Oi!" came from the name of the street, Oil Street. It is also a greeting to call people to participate in art event. In Cantonese, the Chinese name of Oi! is the homonym of its address ( "12" is a homonym for "release" ). The present building of Oi! is the former clubhouse of Royal Hong Kong Yacht Club from 1908 to 1938, which had been listed as a Grade II historic building since 1995. Later, it was used as the Government Supplies Department until 1998. In 1990 to 2000, it was the Oil Street Artist Village, and further changed to a storehouse of the Antiquities and Monuments Office until late 2007.

Hong Kong Newton Hotel 

Hong Kong Newton Hotel, which under Henderson Land Development Company Limited, closed on 25 August 2015. 
The reason why Hong Kong Newton Hotel closed is recessed tourism in Hong Kong. According to the track record of Henderson Land Development Company, the average rate of checking-in has decreased in the first half-year. In the same period last year, Hong Kong Newton Hotel earned $27 million, but this year lost $15 million.
Moreover, the spokesperson of Henderson Land Development Company stated that the rate of checking-in and the room price has decreased because of the highly competitive hotel industry in Hong Kong.

Oil street future development 

A large-scale development project will be carried out at Inland Lot No. 8920 of Oil Street in the near future, after the Lands Department announced that the Ocean Century Investment Limited was awarded the land grant last for 50 years by beating other five companies and became the highest tender. This site has been left vacant since the late 1990s after the Government Supplies Department (GSD) vacated away. It covers around 7,887 square metres while the maximum gross floor area (GFA) is 70,200 square metres. At least 30,000 square metres of it has to be hotel-purpose land use and any ancillary accommodations and the rest of the GFA can be used in any way but industrial usage.
According to the proposal submitted by the Ocean Century Investment Limited, the project will mainly be divided into three parts, which is the construction of hotels, residential areas and the public areas. The residential land use will include less than 400 dwelling units with a maximum of 40,200 domestic gross floor areas. Together with it, ancillary accommodations like resident's clubhouse and recreational areas will be included. In terms of the hotel, it will be built in the shape of sailboat, which is similar to the design of the Burj Al Arab hotel in Dubai. The development project will also cover the construction of public open space, for instance, three public open space areas and a wide Sculpture Plaza with exhibition of art pieces that serves an extension to the future Art Space revitalised from the former Yacht Club.

City Legend 

There are city legends passed by the residents who lived in Oil Street. The residents claimed that there were voice and light-fire appeared in the mortuary which have stopped working in 1998. The other ghost stories, including the red headscarf floated from minibus and the accident happened in an elevator of industrial building. This kind of stories determined the image of Oil Street and made its fame of ghost stories in Hong Kong.

References

External links

 
 

North Point
Fortress Hill
Roads on Hong Kong Island